In computing, decimal32 is a decimal floating-point computer numbering format that occupies 4 bytes (32 bits) in computer memory.
It is intended for applications where it is necessary to emulate decimal rounding exactly, such as financial and tax computations. Like the binary16 format, it is intended for memory saving storage.

Decimal32 supports 7 decimal digits of significand and an exponent range of −95 to +96, i.e.  to ±. Zero has 192 possible representations (384 when both signed zeros are included).

Decimal32 floating point is a relatively new decimal floating-point format, formally introduced in the 2008 version of IEEE 754 as well as with ISO/IEC/IEEE 60559:2011.

Representation of decimal32 values 

IEEE 754 allows two alternative representation methods for decimal32 values.
The standard does not specify how to signify which representation is used,
for instance in a situation where decimal32 values are communicated between systems.

In one representation method, based on binary integer decimal (BID),
the significand is represented as binary coded positive integer.

The other, alternative, representation method is based on
densely packed decimal (DPD) for most of the
significand (except the most significant digit).

Both alternatives provide exactly the same range of representable numbers: 7 digits of significand and  possible exponent values.

In both encodings, BID and DPD, the 2 most significant exponent bits, and the 4 most significant bits of the significand, are combined to 5 bits. The position of the 5 bits in the combination field varies, but otherwise the encoding is identical. 5 bits suffice instead of 6, because the 2 MSBs from the exponent only encode values from 0 to 2 (3 possible values), and the 4 MSBs of the significand represent a decimal digit between 0 and 9 (10 possible values). In total we have  possible values when combined in one encoding, which is representable in 5 bits.

For the BID encoding, the full binary significand is obtained by appending the bits from the trailing significand field to the significand's MSBs, as shown in the BID table above. The resulting significand is a positive binary integer of 24 bits, that has to be divided by 10 repeatedly, to obtain the individual decimal digits.

For the DPD encoding, the DPD table above shows how to obtain the significand's leading decimal digit from the significand's MSBs. To obtain the trailing significand decimal digits, the significant trailing field has to be decoded according to the DPD rules (see below). The full decimal significand is then obtained by concatenating the leading and trailing decimal digits.

For ±Infinity, besides the sign bit, all the remaining bits are ignored (i.e., both the exponent and significand fields have no effect).
For NaNs the sign bit has no meaning in the standard, and is ignored. Therefore, signed and unsigned NaNs are equivalent, even though some programs will show NaNs as signed. The bit g5 determines whether the NaN is quiet (0) or signaling (1). The bits of the significand are the NaN's payload and can hold user defined data (e.g., to distinguish how NaNs were generated). Like for normal significands, the payload of NaNs can be either in BID or DPD encoding.

Binary integer significand field 

As described above, the encoding varies depending on whether the most significant 4 bits of the significand are in the range 0 to 7 (00002 to 01112), or higher (10002 or 10012).

If the  after the sign bit are "00", "01", or "10", then the 
exponent field consists of the  following the sign bit, and the
significand is the remaining , with an implicit leading 0 bit:

 s 00eeeeee   (0)ttt tttttttttt tttttttttt
 s 01eeeeee   (0)ttt tttttttttt tttttttttt
 s 10eeeeee   (0)ttt tttttttttt tttttttttt

This includes subnormal numbers where the leading significand digit is 0.

If the  after the sign bit are "11", then the 8-bit exponent field is shifted  to the right (after both the sign bit and the "11" bits thereafter), and the represented significand is in the remaining . In this case there is an implicit (that is, not stored) leading 3-bit sequence "100" in the true significand.

 s 1100eeeeee (100)t tttttttttt tttttttttt
 s 1101eeeeee (100)t tttttttttt tttttttttt
 s 1110eeeeee (100)t tttttttttt tttttttttt

The "11" 2-bit sequence after the sign bit indicates that there is an implicit "100" 3-bit prefix to the significand. Compare having an implicit 1 in the significand of normal values for the binary formats. The "00", "01", or "10" bits are part of the exponent field.

The leading bits of the significand field do not encode the most significant decimal digit; they are simply part of a larger pure-binary number.

In the above cases, the value represented is

  

If the four bits after the sign bit are "1111" then the value is an infinity or a NaN, as described above:

 s 11110 xx...x    ±infinity
 s 11111 0x...x    a quiet NaN
 s 11111 1x...x    a signalling NaN

Densely packed decimal significand field 
In this version, the significand is stored as a series of decimal digits. The leading digit is between 0 and 9 (3 or 4 binary bits), and the rest of the significand uses the densely packed decimal (DPD) encoding.

The leading  of the exponent and the leading digit (3 or ) of the significand are combined into the five bits that follow the sign bit.

These six bits after that are the exponent continuation field, providing the less-significant bits of the exponent.

The last  are the significand continuation field, consisting of two 10-bit declets. Each declet encodes three decimal digits using the DPD encoding.

If the first two bits after the sign bit are "00", "01", or "10", then those are the leading bits of the exponent, and the three bits after that are interpreted as the leading decimal digit (0 to 7):

 s 00 TTT (00)eeeeee (0TTT)[tttttttttt][tttttttttt]
 s 01 TTT (01)eeeeee (0TTT)[tttttttttt][tttttttttt]
 s 10 TTT (10)eeeeee (0TTT)[tttttttttt][tttttttttt]

If the first two bits after the sign bit are "11", then the second two bits are the leading bits of the exponent, and the last bit is prefixed with "100" to form the leading decimal digit (8 or 9):

 s 1100 T (00)eeeeee (100T)[tttttttttt][tttttttttt]
 s 1101 T (01)eeeeee (100T)[tttttttttt][tttttttttt]
 s 1110 T (10)eeeeee (100T)[tttttttttt][tttttttttt]

The remaining two combinations (11110 and 11111) of the 5-bit field
are used to represent ±infinity and NaNs, respectively.

The DPD/3BCD transcoding for the declets is given by the following table.
b9...b0 are the bits of the DPD, and d2...d0 are the three BCD digits.

The 8 decimal values whose digits are all 8s or 9s have four codings each.
The bits marked x in the table above are ignored on input, but will always be 0 in computed results.
(The  non-standard encodings fill in the gap between )

In the above cases, with the true significand as the sequence of decimal digits decoded, the value represented is

See also 
 Scientific notation

References 

Computer arithmetic
Data types
Floating point types